The 2011 Central Connecticut Blue Devils football team represented Central Connecticut State University as a member of the Northeast Conference (NEC) in the 2011 NCAA Division I FCS football season. The Blue Devils were led by sixth-year head coach Jeff McInerney and played their home games at Arute Field. They finished the season 4–7 overall and 3–5 in NEC play to tie for sixth place.

Schedule

References

Central Connecticut
Central Connecticut Blue Devils football seasons
Central Connecticut Blue Devils football